Cristian Marian Chirică (born 9 April 1997) is a Romanian rugby union player. He plays as a flanker for professional SuperLiga club CSM Baia Mare.

Club career
Chirică started playing rugby as a youth for a local Romanian club based in Bârlad. In July 2015 he started his professional journey joining SuperLiga side, CSM Baia Mare.

International career
Chirică is also selected for Romania's national team, the Oaks, making his international debut in a test match against the Canucks on 19 November 2016.

References

External links

 
 
 

1997 births
Living people
Sportspeople from Bârlad
Romanian rugby union players
Romania international rugby union players
CSM Știința Baia Mare players
Rugby union flankers
Rugby union number eights